John Wentworth (March 5, 1815 – October 16, 1888), nicknamed Long John, was the editor of the Chicago Democrat, publisher of an extensive Wentworth family genealogy, a two-term mayor of Chicago, and a six-term member of the United States House of Representatives, both before and after his service as mayor.

After growing up in New Hampshire, he joined the migration west and moved to the developing city of Chicago in 1836, where he made his adult life. Wentworth was affiliated with the Democratic Party until 1855; then he changed to the Republican Party. After retiring from politics, he wrote a three-volume genealogy of the Wentworth family in the United States.

Early life and education
John Wentworth was born in Sandwich, New Hampshire. He was educated at the New Hampton Literary Institute and at the academy of Dudley Leavitt. He graduated from Dartmouth College in 1836.

Migration west and career
Later that year, Wentworth joined a migration west and moved to Chicago, arriving in the city on October 25, 1836. He became managing editor of Chicago's first newspaper, the Chicago Democrat, eventually becoming its owner and publisher.

Wentworth was admitted to the bar in 1841.

He started a law practice and entered politics. He was a business partner of Illinois financier Jacob Bunn, and the two men were two of the incorporators of the Chicago Secure Depository Company.

Marriage and family
In 1844, he married Roxanna Marie Loomis. 

In later years, his nephew Moses J. Wentworth handled his business affairs, and would eventually manage his estate as well.

Political career
Wentworth started his political involvement as a Jacksonian democrat, and promoted these views in the Chicago Democrat. After he supported the 1837 mayoral candidacy of William Ogden, including throwing the newspaper behind Ogden's candidacy, he was appointed by Odgen to serve in the post of city printer.

Wentworth, after having become active in Democratic politics, was elected to the U.S. House of Representatives, where he served for a total of six terms, five of them as a Democrat: (March 4, 1843March 3, 1851 and March 4, 1853March 3, 1855).

He returned to Chicago and affiliated with the Republican Party. Wentworth was first elected mayor in the 1857 Chicago mayoral election; he served two terms, 1857–1858 and 1860–1861 (being elected to his second term in the 1860 Chicago mayoral election). In his second term, he again affiliated with the Democratic Party.

As mayor Wentworth instituted the use of chain gangs of prisoners in the city as laborers.

In July 1857, while serving as mayor of Chicago, Wentworth was charged with assaulting an attorney named Charles Cameron, who was attempting to communicate with his incarcerated client. Cameron testified that Wentworth "seized him by the coat collar and shirt bosom" and forcibly removed him from the prison, alleging that he had resisted officers. Wentworth, after requesting the case be delayed twice, refused to appear in court. The Judge found in favor of Cameron and charged Wentworth amounts of $25 "and costs" and $200.
 
In his effort to clean up the city's morals, he hired spies to determine who was frequenting Chicago's brothels. In 1857, Wentworth led a raid on "the Sands," Chicago's red-light district, which resulted in the burning of the area.

Wentworth served on the Chicago Board of Education.

In 1864, Wentworth ran again for Congress, as a Republican, and was elected for his last term, serving March 4, 1865March 3, 1867. While he was in the House, there was a controversial vote to settle a boundary issue between Wisconsin and Illinois, with Wisconsin claiming land as far as the tip of Lake Michigan. Wentworth was promised that if he voted to give the land including Chicago to Wisconsin, he would be appointed to the US Senate. Wentworth declined the offer.

According to city historians in Sandwich, Illinois, Wentworth was one of the key individuals who was responsible for the city getting a railroad stop.  The town, which at the time, was called "Newark Station", was given the station, and in turn, the town gave Wentworth the honor of naming the town, which he subsequently named after his hometown, Sandwich, New Hampshire.  It is also to note that the boundary line dispute with Wisconsin would have cut through present-day Sandwich, as it straddles the northern border with neighboring LaSalle County, which would have been the State Line had Wentworth not been successful in moving the line north.

After retiring from Congress, from 1868 Wentworth lived at his country estate at 5441 South Harlem Avenue in Chicago.

When an author left a manuscript of a history of Chicago with Wentworth for his suggestions, he reportedly removed what did not refer to him and returned the manuscript to its author with the note, "Here is your expurgated and correct history of Chicago."

Family historian
He researched and wrote The Wentworth Genealogy – English and American - twice, which he published privately. The first two-volume edition, also known as the "private edition", published in 1871, was followed by a second, corrected, edition in 1878, which was published in three volumes, for a total of 2241 pages. The total reported cost for both editions was $40,000. The first  of the 1878 volumes chronicles the ancestry of Elder William Wentworth, the first of this family in New England, and his first five generations of New World descendants. The second  and third  volumes discuss the "Elder's" many descendants and others of the name.  John was a fourth great-grandson of William.

Death
Wentworth died at his estate in 1888, aged 73. He was buried in Rosehill Cemetery in Chicago.

At his request, his tombstone was a sixty-foot tall granite obelisk that was imported from New Hampshire on two railroad cars. It was, at the time, the tallest tombstone in the west.

See also
The Wentworth Letter

References

Further reading
 Fehrenbacher, Don E. Chicago Giant: A Biography of "Long John" Wentworth (1957).
 Fehrenbacher, Don E. “Lincoln and the Mayor of Chicago.” Wisconsin Magazine of History 40#4 (1957), pp. 237–44. online

External links

John Wentworth, "First Inaugural Address", Chicago Public Library
John Wentworth, "Second Inaugural Address", Chicago Public Library

1815 births
1888 deaths
People from Sandwich, New Hampshire
Illinois Republicans
Mayors of Chicago
Illinois lawyers
19th-century American newspaper publishers (people)
Burials at Rosehill Cemetery
Dartmouth College alumni
Democratic Party members of the United States House of Representatives from Illinois
Republican Party members of the United States House of Representatives from Illinois
19th-century American journalists
American male journalists
19th-century American male writers
19th-century American politicians
19th-century American lawyers
Members of the Chicago Board of Education
New Hampton School alumni